

General 
Austroglanis barnardi is an endangered species of catfish (order Siluriformes). It is one of three members of the family Austroglanididae. It is also known as the spotted rock-catfish or Barnard's rock-catfish.

Biology 
Not much is known about the biology of A. barnardi because of the discovery being so recent. It has a 12-year generation time but nothing more is known about reproduction within the species. It feeds on aquatic insects, benthic invertebrates and other small fishes.

Habitat 
This species is endemic to South Africa and is found only in freshwater bodies of subtropical climate. It has only been recorded from the Thee, Noordhoeks and Hex Rivers, which are all small tributaries of the Clanwilliam Olifants River System in the Western Cape, South Africa. It is extremely uncommon in these two streams it inhabits. A. barnardi inhabits riffles among loosely bedded rocks and coarse sand. Its preferred water depth is between 10-60 centimeters. Other species that occur in this area include Pseudobarbus phlegethon, Barbus calidus, and Austroglanis gilli.

Physical Description 
These fish reach a length of about 8 centimeters (3 in). Its head is flattened with a broad snout with its eyes located on the top of the head. The mouth is located on the underside of the head along with fleshy lips.  It has three pairs of barbels. It has short, round fins accompanied by weak, curved spines on the pectoral and dorsal fins. Their color is golden-brown with dark brown blotches.

Threats 
A. barnardi is threatened by various forms of habitat destruction such as stream channelization, water abstraction, and sedimentation, all of which reduce the incidence of their obligate riffle habitat. Portions of their river habitat are adjacent to agricultural fields and orchards, so it is likely that pesticides and insecticides affect populations. It has been threatened by the introduction of invasive species such as tilapia, smallmouth bass and the bluegill sunfish.

Conservation 
Biologists have recently discussed many conservation methods. In 2013, an alien fish barrier was constructed across a section of the Noordhoeks River to keep Micropterus species from moving upstream from this section of river. Additionally, invasive spotted bass were removed mechanically from sections of the Thee river mechanically between 2010 and 2014. No known populations are currently within the boundaries of any provincial nature reserves.

References

Austroglanididae
Freshwater fish of South Africa